Furmanovo is the name of several inhabited localities in Russia.

Rural localities
Furmanovo, Kaliningrad Oblast, a settlement in Gusevskoye Urban Settlement of Gusevsky District of Kaliningrad Oblast
Furmanovo, Primorsky Krai, a settlement in Mikhaylovka Rural Settlement of Olginsky District of Primorsky Krai
Furmanovo, Saratov Oblast, a settlement in Kirovskoye Rural Settlement of Marksovsky District of Saratov Oblast